Novorossiysk is a Russian Project 21900M diesel-electric icebreaker. She was built by Vyborg Shipyard in Russia and delivered to Rosmorport in 2016.

Novorossiysk, which represents a further development of the icebreakers Moskva and Sankt-Peterburg, has two identical sister ships: Vladivostok and Murmansk.

Development and construction 

In the 2000s, Russia began renewing the state-owned icebreaker fleet that, at the time, consisted mainly of Soviet-era vessels dating back to the 1970s and 1980s. In July 2004, the Saint Petersburg-based Baltic Shipyard won an international tender for the construction of two 16-megawatt diesel-electric icebreakers for Rosmorport, a state-owned company established in 2003 to manage Russia's port infrastructure and operate its fleet of diesel-powered icebreakers. These icebreakers, Moskva (delivered in 2008) and Sankt-Peterburg (2009), were the first non-nuclear icebreaker built in Russia for over three decades and the first new icebreakers ordered following the dissolution of the Soviet Union.

In 2011, the Russian government decided to continue the fleet renewal within the framework of the federal program Development of the Transport System of Russia (2010–2020) with three additional 16-megawatt diesel-electric icebreakers. The construction of the first icebreaker awarded to Vyborg Shipyard on 2 December 2011. On 23 February 2012, the remaining two vessels were also contracted to Vyborg Shipyard which was acquired by the state-owned United Shipbuilding Corporation (USC) to solve the shipyard's financial problems.

The new icebreakers, referred to as Project 21900M, represent a further development of the original Project 21900 design. Modifications to the original design include, among smaller general improvements, a slightly different diesel-electric power plant configuration and more efficient pulling-type propulsion units where the propeller is facing forward. While Project 21900M vessels were still sometimes referred to as "16-megawatt icebreakers", their propulsion power was increased to 18 megawatts. Externally, the most apparent difference is the helideck which has been moved to the foredeck and enlarged for the bigger Mil Mi-8 helicopter.

While the steel cutting for the second Project 21900M to be built by Vyborg Shipyard was not set to begin until sometime 2013, the production began ahead of schedule and the keel laying ceremony was held on 12 December 2012. After the launching of the first icebreaker, Vladivostok, hull assembly of the sister vessel began on the shipyard's semi-submersible barge Atlant in May 2019. The unfinished vessel was launched on 29 October 2015 and delivered to Rosmorport on 26 December 2016.

Like the preceding Project 21900 icebreakers, the new icebreakers are also named after major cities of Russia with Novorossiysk representing the main Russian port city on the Black Sea. While a similar naming scheme was also used for a series of five diesel-electric polar icebreakers built by the Finnish shipbuilder Wärtsilä in the 1960s, Novorossiysks 1965-built Soviet-era counterpart, Kiev, was named the city that became the capital city of Ukraine following the dissolution of the Soviet Union.

Design 

Fully laden, the  icebreaker draws  of water. While her official Russian Maritime Register of Shipping ice class is Icebreaker6, Novorossiysks hull and propulsion units are strengthened to meet the requirements for Icebreaker7, a higher ice class intended for icebreaking operations in the Arctic.

Novorossiysk has a fully integrated diesel-electric propulsion system with main diesel generators supplying power for both main propulsion as well as ship's service loads while underway. Her main power plant consists of four 12-cylinder Wärtsilä 12V32E four-stroke medium-speed diesel engines rated at  each. In addition, there are two  Wärtsilä 4L20 auxiliary diesel generators for use when the vessel is at port and a  emergency diesel generator.

For main propulsion, Novorossiysk is fitted with two electrically driven azimuth thrusters. Her two Steerprop SP110ARCPULL Z-drive units, each driven by two  electric propulsion motors in tandem configuration, were the most powerful mechanical azimuth thrusters in the world at the time of delivery. In addition, she has a transverse bow thruster for maneuvering.

Career 

Unlike the other Project 21900M icebreakers, Novorossiysk has been operating primarily in the Arctic and in the Russian far east. In January 2017, the vessel's debut voyage to the high latitudes took her to Franz Josef Land and for the rest of the icebreaking season she provided icebreaking services in the White Sea. In 2018, she supported offshore drilling operations in the Kara Sea with ice management. After having been stationed in the Far East Basin during the 2018–2019 icebreaking season, Novorossiysk was deployed to Pevek until 31 October 2019. In August, she began escorting the cruise ship Silver Explorer along the Northern Sea Route.

Novorossiysk has also participated once in the annual Festival of Icebreakers in Saint Petersburg; the icebreaker was open to visitors in 2018.

References 

Project 21900M icebreakers
2015 ships
Ships built at Vyborg Shipyard